The 2008 1. divisjon season (referred to as Adeccoligaen for sponsorship reasons) began on 5 April 2008 and ended on 1 November 2008.

In 2009, the number of teams in the top tier, Tippeligaen, will expand from fourteen to sixteen. Therefore, 2008 was a transitional season, in which more teams were promoted to the top flight, and less teams relegated to the 2. divisjon, than usual. Automatic promotion was awarded to the teams finishing in the top three places in the standings. Only the two teams at the bottom of the standings were relegated to the 2. divisjon, as opposed to the regular four.

The three clubs relegated from the Tippeligaen in 2007 were Odd Grenland, Start and Sandefjord. At the conclusion of the season, all three had managed to secure promotion, with Odd Grenland being confirmed as champions of the 1. divisjon after defeating Start 3–2 in the penultimate round.

Sandnes Ulf and Hødd were relegated to the 2. divisjon after finishing in fifteenth and sixteenth place respectively. It was Sandnes Ulf's first season at the second level since 1972. Nybergsund, who had never previously played at the second level, retained their spot, finishing in eighth place.

As in previous years, there was a two-legged promotion playoff at the end of the season, this time between the fourth-placed team in the 1. divisjon (Sogndal) and the thirteenth-placed team in the Tippeligaen (Aalesund). Aalesund kept their spot in the Tippeligaen, beating Sogndal 4-1 away, 3-1 at home, and 7-2 on aggregate.

League table

Results

Promotion play-offs

By finishing 4th, Sogndal competed in a two-legged relegation play-off against Aalesund, who finished 13th in the 2008 Tippeligaen, for the right to play in the 2009 Tippeligaen. Sogndal played at home first, decided in a draw held by the NFF. Aalesund won 7–2 on aggregate, thereby securing a new season in the Tippeligaen. Sogndal remained in the 1. divisjon.

Aalesund won 7–2 on aggregate and remained in Tippeligaen.

Top goalscorers

Source: VG Nett

Relegated teams
These three teams were relegated from the Tippeligaen in 2007:

Odd Grenland
Start
Sandefjord

Promoted teams
These four teams were promoted from the 2. divisjon in 2007:

Alta
Hødd
Nybergsund-Trysil
Sandnes Ulf

See also 
 2008 Tippeligaen
 2008 2. divisjon
 2008 3. divisjon

References

External links 
 1. divisjon 2008 on NRK Sport: Fixtures and results - Top scorers, Yellow cards, Red cards - Standings

Norwegian First Division seasons
2
Norway
Norway